Charles Lambart may refer to:

Charles Lambart, 1st Earl of Cavan (1600-1660), MP for Bossiney
Charles Lambart, 3rd Earl of Cavan (1649-1702)
Charles Lambart (died 1753), MP  for Kilbeggan (Parliament of Ireland constituency) and Cavan

See also
Charles Lambert (disambiguation)